Gusans (Parthian for poet-musician or minstrel) were creative and performing artists - singers, instrumentalists, dancers, storytellers, and professional folk actors in public theaters of Parthia and ancient and medieval Armenia. 

In Armenia, the term gusan is often used as a synonym for ashugh, a singer-poet and bard.

Etymology 
The word gusan is first mentioned in early Armenian texts of V c., e.g. Faustus of Byzantium, Moses of Chorene, etc. In Parsian language the earliest known evidence is from Vis o Rāmin by Fakhruddin As'ad Gurgani in the eleventh century. It was originally thought to have been a personal name. However in the 19th century Kerovbe Patkanian identified it as a common word possibly meaning "musician" and suggested that it was an obsolete Persian term, currently found in a form of a loanword in Armenian. In 1934 Harold Walter Bailey linked to origin of the word to the Parthian language. In Hrachia Acharian's opinion the word was borrowed into Parthian from Armenian govasan "praiser", then borrowed back into Armenian as gusan. The word is attested in Manichaean Parthian as gwsʾn. For a thorough linguistic treatment of the word see gwsʾn.

History

In Parthia and Sassanian Iran
Music and poetry constituted an essential part of Parthian culture, serving as an important indicator of belonging in the secular society of ancient Parthia. It is not known from ancient sources how the Parthian gosans were trained, but the predominance of hereditary transmission of professions in Ancient Iran makes it possible for transmission from family education and the transfer of knowledge from fathers to children. Historians believe that each feudal clan had its own clan minstrel gosans who knew the history and traditions of the clan and glorified them in their works.

The Gosans enjoyed great privileges and authority in ancient Iranian society. According to medieval Iranian sources, not a single significant event could do without them. Gusan art reached a focal point of development during the Sasanian Empire. One of the most famous gusans (minstrel poets) of the Sassanian era was Barbad.

Parthian influence has left clear traces in some aspects of Armenian culture. Thus, the gusans mentioned by Armenian authors are a replica of the Parthian gusans. Mary Boyce believes that the Parthian cultural influence was so strong in the region, and in particular in Armenia, that it is likely that the Parthian gusans influenced not only the name but also, the Armenian art form.

In Armenia

The origin of Armenian religious and secular songs and their instrumental counterparts takes place in time immemorial. Songs arise from various expressions of Armenian folk art such as rituals, religious practices and mythological performances in the form of music, poetry, dance and theatre. Performers of these forms of expression, gradually honing their skills and developing theoretical aspects, have created a performing tradition. In ancient Armenia, musicians that were referred to as "vipasans”(storytellers) appeared in historical sources as early as the first millennium BC. Vipasans raised the art of secular song and music to a new level. Over time, the vipasans were replaced by "govasans" which later became known as "gusans.” The art of the latter is one of the most important manifestations of medieval Armenian culture, which left indelible traces in the consciousness and spiritual life of people. Gusans, cultivating this particular art form, created monumental works in both lyric and epic genres, thus enriching both national and international cultural heritage (such examples are the heroic epic “David of Sasun” and a series of lyric poems -hairens)

In the early Middle Ages the word gusan was used as an equivalent to the classical Greek word mimos (mime). There were 2 groups of gousans:

1. the first were from aristocratic dynasties (feudal lords) and performed as professional musicians.

2. the second group comprised popular, but illiterate gusans.

Gusans wore long hair, combed up in a cone so that the hairstyle resembled the "tail" of a comet. This hairstyle was supported by a "gisakal" placed under it, which was the prototype of "onkos" - a triangle placed under the wig of ancient tragedians.

The gusans were sometimes criticized and sometimes praised, particularly in medieval Armenia. The adoption of Christianity had its influence upon Armenian minstrelsy, gradually altering its ethical and ideological orientation. This led to the eventual replacement of gusans with ashughs.

The center of gusans was Goghtn gavar - a region in the Vaspurakan province of Greater Armenia and bordered with province of Syunik.

References

 Grigor Suni, Armenian music, Yerevan, 2005, p. 98-99, 

Armenian culture
Armenian music
Iranian music
Iranian culture
Iranian words and phrases
Parthian Empire